Tak Wah Mak,  (born October 4, 1946, in China) is a Canadian medical researcher, geneticist, oncologist, and biochemist. He first became widely known for his discovery of the T-cell receptor in 1983 and pioneering work in the genetics of immunology. In 1995, Mak published a landmark paper on the discovery of the function of the immune checkpoint protein CTLA-4, thus opening the path for immunotherapy/checkpoint inhibitors as a means of cancer treatment. Mak is also the founder of Agios Pharmaceuticals, whose lead compound, IDHIFA®, was approved by the FDA for acute myeloid leukemia in August 2017, becoming the first drug specifically targeting cancer metabolism to be used for cancer treatment. He has worked in a variety of areas including biochemistry, immunology, and cancer genetics.

Early life
Born in southern China in 1946 to parents who were silk merchants, and raised in Hong Kong, parents encouraged him to become a doctor, his interests lay elsewhere - in math, biology, and chemistry. Mak and his family moved to the United States of America during the mid-1960s and with the choice of going to the University of California or Wisconsin, he was persuaded by his mother to attend Wisconsin to avoid the antiwar activities at California. His interest in life and chemistry led him to eventually studying biochemistry and biophysics at the University of Wisconsin.

University life
At the University of Wisconsin, Mak met virologist Roland Rueckert.  Mak initially went to his lab to inquire about a job posting from Rueckert's lab looking for someone to wash test tubes. After his first day on the job, Mak asked if more cleaning work was available, in which Rueckert said there was not, however there was experimental research work available. That, as Mak would later state, would be the beginning of his scientific career.  After finishing his degree at Wisconsin, Mak moved to Canada to begin his doctoral studies at the University of Alberta, Edmonton. In the early 1970s, he earned his PhD in biochemistry from the University of Alberta. After he obtained his degree, Mak moved to Toronto and became a Canadian citizen. In Toronto, he worked with Ernest McCulloch and James Till, who discovered haematopoietic stem cells.

Scientific career
In 1980, Mak returned to Wisconsin to learn new techniques in the lab of Howard Martin Temin, who won the Nobel Prize in Physiology or Medicine in 1975 for his discovery of the enzyme reverse transcriptase. Temin would be one of his mentors that shaped his way of thinking, encouraging him to delve into diverse disciplines. During the early 1980s in Toronto, with his newly setup group, Mak was working on virology. Mak employed a technique called molecular subtraction, used by virologists, to attempt to identify the T-cell receptor, which was so elusive at the time it was referred to as the "Holy Grail of Immunology." In 1984, Mak discovered the T-cell receptor, with Mark M. Davis identifying the receptor in mouse. This work on the cloning of T-cell receptor genes, has been cited nearly 1200 times.  In spite of offers from prestigious institutions around the world, Mak remained committed to Canada's scientific community.

In 1993, Mak received support from the world's largest independent biotech company, Amgen, to establish the Amgen Research Institute in Toronto. Financial support from Amgen  resulted in his lab pioneering the use of knockout mice, and as a result his lab generated one of the first knockout mice and has generated more knockout mice than any other lab in the world. Mak's role in advancing the use of genetically altered mice in scientific study has led to important breakthroughs in immunology and understanding cancer at the cellular level. As of 2005, Amgen-produced papers have been cited more than 40,000 times. The basic research in cancer conducted by Mak has been published in top international scientific journals and he has given several keynote addresses at cancer symposia across Canada and the United States. By 1995, Mak had reached a high point in his career, when he and his team published their seminal findings on the function of CTLA-4, thus paving the road for Immunotherapy and Checkpoint inhibition as potential anti-cancer therapies.

In 2004 Mak became the director of the Advanced Medical Discovery Institute and the Campbell Family Institute for Breast Cancer Research. He is also the senior scientist, division of Stem Cell and Developmental Biology, Advanced Medical Discovery Institute/Ontario Cancer Institute. He is a member of the Cancer Research Institute Scientific Advisory Council. Since 1984, he has been a Professor in the Departments of Medical Biophysics and Immunology at the University of Toronto.

From the early 2000s, Mak concentrated his efforts on the emerging field of cancer metabolism. Mak, Lewis C. Cantley, and Craig B. Thompson together founded Agios Pharmaceuticals, a biotech pharmaceutical company whose sole purpose is to discover methods of targeting cancer metabolism. The trio have contributed immensely in a few years to what was originally a forgotten paradigm. The discovery of the involvement of particular enzymes such as PKM2, mutated IDH as well as novel oncometabolites such as 2-hydroxyglutarate in cancer development have once again brought cancer metabolism back to the forefront of cancer biology. On August 1, Agios announced that the FDA had approved their lead compound, IDHIFA®, for the treatment of acute myeloid leukemia. IDHIFA® targets a mutant form of Isocitrate dehydrogenase 2 and is the first drug specifically targeting cancer metabolism to be used for cancer treatment.

Mak holds Honorary Doctoral Degrees from numerous universities in North America and Europe. He is an Officer of the Order of Canada and has been elected a Foreign Associate of the National Academy of Sciences (USA) as well as a Fellow of the Royal Society of London (UK.) He has won international recognition in the forms of the Emil von Behring Prize, the King Faisal Prize for Medicine, the Gairdner Foundation International Award, the Sloan Prize of the General Motors Cancer Foundation, the Paul Ehrlich and Ludwig Darmstaedter Prize, the Novartis Prize in Immunology, and the Szent-Györgyi Prize for Progress in Cancer Research.

Honors 
1985, awarded the Steacie Prize
1986, elected a Fellow of the Royal Society of Canada
1988, awarded the Emil von Behring Prize
1989, awarded the Gairdner Foundation International Award
1990, awarded the Royal Society of Canada's McLaughlin Medal
1994, made a Fellow of the Royal Society
1995, awarded the King Faisal Prize for Medicine
1996, awarded the Robert L. Noble Prize by the National Cancer Institute of Canada
1996, awarded the Sloan Prize of the General Motors Cancer Foundation
2000, made an Officer of the Order of Canada
2002, elected as a foreign associate to the National Academy of Sciences in the discipline of immunology
2003, awarded the Killam Prize by the Canada Council for the Arts.
2004, awarded the Paul Ehrlich and Ludwig Darmstaedter Prize
2005, elected as an International Honorary Member of the American Academy of Arts and Sciences.
2007, awarded the Order of Ontario.
2009, introduced to the Canadian Medical Hall of Fame.
2015, award the Top 25 Canadian Immigrant Awards.
2021, awarded the Szent-Györgyi Prize for Progress in Cancer Research
2023 awarded the Pezcoller Foundation-AACR International Award for Extraordinary Achievement in Cancer Research.

Select publications

References

External links
 University of Toronto biography
 University Health Network Profile

1946 births
Living people
Canadian biochemists
Canadian geneticists
Canadian medical researchers
Canadian oncologists
Canadian Fellows of the Royal Society
Fellows of the Royal Society of Canada
Hong Kong emigrants to Canada
Members of the Order of Canada
Members of the Order of Ontario
Scientists from Toronto
Foreign associates of the National Academy of Sciences
University of Wisconsin–Madison alumni
Academic staff of the University of Toronto
Canadian people of Chinese descent
Hong Kong scientists
Officers of the Order of Canada